Jupunba is a genus in the family Fabaceae. It is native to region from South Mexico extending to tropical America.

Taxonomy

Species
Jupunba has 37 accepted species:
Jupunba abbottii (Rose & Leonard) Britton & Rose
Jupunba adenophora (Ducke) M.V.B.Soares, M.P.Morim & Iganci
Jupunba alexandri (Urb.) Britton & Rose
Jupunba asplenifolia (Griseb.) Britton & Rose
Jupunba auriculata (Benth.) M.V.B.Soares, M.P.Morim & Iganci
Jupunba barbouriana (Standl.) M.V.B.Soares, M.P.Morim & Iganci
Jupunba barnebyana (Iganci & M.P.Lima) M.V.B.Soares, M.P.Morim & Iganci
Jupunba brachystachya (DC.) M.V.B.Soares, M.P.Morim & Iganci
Jupunba campestris (Spruce ex Benth.) M.V.B.Soares, M.P.Morim & Iganci
Jupunba cochleata (Willd.) M.V.B.Soares, M.P.Morim & Iganci
Jupunba commutata (Barneby & J.W.Grimes) M.V.B.Soares, M.P.Morim & Iganci
Jupunba curvicarpa (H.S.Irwin) M.V.B.Soares, M.P.Morim & Iganci
Jupunba ferruginea (Benth.) M.V.B.Soares, M.P.Morim & Iganci
Jupunba filamentosa (Benth.) M.V.B.Soares, M.P.Morim & Iganci
Jupunba floribunda (Spruce ex Benth.) M.V.B.Soares, M.P.Morim & Iganci
Jupunba gallorum (Barneby & J.W.Grimes) M.V.B.Soares, M.P.Morim & Iganci
Jupunba ganymedea (Barneby & J.W.Grimes) M.V.B.Soares, M.P.Morim & Iganci
Jupunba glauca (Urb.) Britton & Rose
Jupunba idiopoda (S.F.Blake) M.V.B.Soares, M.P.Morim & Iganci
Jupunba laeta (Benth.) M.V.B.Soares, M.P.Morim & Iganci
Jupunba langsdorffii (Benth.) M.V.B.Soares, M.P.Morim & Iganci
Jupunba leucophylla (Spruce ex Benth.) M.V.B.Soares, M.P.Morim & Iganci
Jupunba longipedunculata (H.S.Irwin) M.V.B.Soares, M.P.Morim & Iganci
Jupunba macradenia (Pittier) M.V.B.Soares, M.P.Morim & Iganci
Jupunba mataybifolia (Sandwith) M.V.B.Soares, M.P.Morim & Iganci
Jupunba microcalyx (Spruce ex Benth.) M.V.B.Soares, M.P.Morim & Iganci
Jupunba nipensis (Britton) Britton & Rose
Jupunba obovalis (A.Rich.) Britton & Rose
Jupunba oppositifolia (Urb.) Britton & Rose
Jupunba oxyphyllidia (Barneby & J.W.Grimes) M.V.B.Soares, M.P.Morim & Iganci
Jupunba piresii (Barneby & J.W.Grimes) M.V.B.Soares, M.P.Morim & Iganci
Jupunba rhombea (Benth.) M.V.B.Soares, M.P.Morim & Iganci
Jupunba trapezifolia (Vahl) Moldenke
Jupunba turbinata (Benth.) M.V.B.Soares, M.P.Morim & Iganci
Jupunba villifera (Ducke) M.V.B.Soares, M.P.Morim & Iganci
Jupunba villosa (Iganci & M.P.Lima) M.V.B.Soares, M.P.Morim & Iganci
Jupunba zolleriana (Standl. & Steyerm.) M.V.B.Soares, M.P.Morim & Iganci

References

Fabaceae genera
Mimosoids